Vernal is a city in Uintah County, Utah, United States.

Vernal may also refer to:

Places
 Vernal, Mississippi, unincorporated community in Greene County, Mississippi, United States
 Vernal Fall, waterfall in Yosemite National Park, California, United States
 Vernal (crater), impact crater on Mars

People
 Ewen Vernal (born 1964), Scottish musician
 Irène Vernal (1912–2008), Belgian actress
 Mike Vernal (born 1980), American venture capitalist
 Vernal Charles (1985–2013), South African cricketer

Other uses
 Vernal point, the point on the celestial sphere where the Sun is located during the northern spring equinox
 Vernal pool, temporary pools of water that provide habitat for distinctive plants and animals
 Vernal keratoconjunctivitis is an allergic conjunctivitis associated with springtime

See also
 Vernel (disambiguation)
 Vernalization
 Spring (disambiguation)